The Canadian Bravery Decorations are a group of Canadian medals awarded for bravery. They are part of the Canadian Honour System created in 1967. The awards themselves were established in 1972. The Canadian Bravery Decorations recognize courageous acts in all situations not in the presence of an armed enemy. These are different from the Canada Bravery Awards, administered by the Royal Canadian Humane Association.

They are as follows:

 Cross of Valour
 Star of Courage
 Medal of Bravery

References

External links
 Canadian Forces Administrative Order 18-4 Recommendations for Canadian Orders, Decorations and Military Honours

Military awards and decorations of Canada